Mama Bird is a restaurant in Portland, Oregon.

Description
Mama Bird is a casual, counter-service restaurant in the Slabtown neighborhood of Portland's Northwest District, with a seating capacity of approximately 90 people. The interior has high ceilings, large windows, natural wood, neutral tones, and plants. Mama Bird's "allergy-friendly" menu focuses on grilled chicken and vegetables. Pete Cottell of Willamette Week has said the menu "splits the difference between comfort food and health food".

History

Gabriel Pascuzzi opened the restaurant on September 26, 2019. Soon after, Mama Bird closed temporarily because of smoke pollution complaints from neighbors. It reopened in November. In June 2020, the restaurant donated $3 for each bird sold to Know Your Rights Camp, during the George Floyd protests. During the COVID-19 pandemic, the restaurant had patio service, as of September 2020.

Reception
In 2019, Eater Portland Alex Frane included Mama Bird in his list of "16 Quintessential Restaurants and Bars in Slabtown". In 2021, the website's Brooke Jackson-Glidden said "Mama Bird is a godsend, with grilled chicken and vegetables that have a refreshing element of creativity and finesse".

References

External links

 
 

2019 establishments in Oregon
Northwest District, Portland, Oregon
Restaurants established in 2019
Restaurants in Portland, Oregon